Boberg is a surname. Notable people with the surname include:

 Anna Boberg (1864–1935), Swedish artist
 Carina Boberg (1952–2020), Swedish actress
 Carl Boberg (1859–1940), Swedish poet and legislator
 Charles Boberg, Canadian linguist
 Einer Boberg (1935–1995), Danish-Canadian speech pathologist
 Ferdinand Boberg (1860–1946), Swedish architect
 Inger Margrethe Boberg (1900–1957), Danish folklore researcher and writer
 Jørgen Boberg (1940–2009), Danish artist
 Oliver Boberg (born 1965), German artist
 Thomas Boberg (born 1960), Danish writer

Surname
 Boberg Hundred, a geographic division in Sweden